`Ali ibn Da`ud was the first Emir of Harar and ruled from 1647-71. He founded a new dynasty of rulers which ruled the city of Harar and its surrounding areas. According to Richard Pankhurst, during his reign, the Harar's problems with the surrounding Oromos continued. In 1662 the Emir's troops met in battle of the Illamo Oromo, "which resulting in heavy casualties, doubtless on both sides," notes Pankhurst. "Those killed included the Amir's son Sabr ad-Din."

He was succeeded by his son, Abdallah I ibn Ali.

See also
 List of emirs of Harar
 Emirate of Harar
 Harar

References 

1671 deaths
Emirs of Harar
Year of birth unknown